Akoko South-West is a Local Government Area in Ondo State, Nigeria. Its headquarters are in the town of Oke-Oka. It has its area council at Oka-Akoko

It has an area of 226 km and a population of 239,486 at the 2006 census.

Ondo State House of Assembly Representatives 
The local government area is represented at the state's legislative house by Hon. Olugbenga Omole (Akoko South West I) and Hon. (Eldr) Felemu Gudubankole O (Akoko South-West II)

The postal code of the area is 342107.

References

Local Government Areas in Ondo State